Kiyan Williams (born 1991) is an American gender non-conforming, multidisciplinary artist who explores Black Queer Subjectivity. Their practice involves various media including video, sound art, installations, and performance that are informed by autoethnography, an investigation of archival materials, and social intervention. In addition to being a practicing artist, Williams is a cultural writer.  They have contributed to publications such as the Huffington Post and The Feminist Wire. Williams lives and works in New York City, New York.

Early life and education 
Kiyan Williams was born in 1991 in Newark, New Jersey. Williams moved to California to attend Stanford University. Williams has focused on comparative studies in Race and Ethnicity, which they also focused on as a Gates Millennium Scholar recipient in 2009.  In 2014, Williams moved to New York City to develop their performance Unearthing.

Performance work 

Kiyan Williams works across multiple disciplines, including performance art. In addition to creating their own performance based works, they have collaborated with and participated in other artists performances pieces that deal with similar issues of Queerness. William's longest ongoing project is Unearthing, which began in 2014. In an interview in Paper magazine, Williams said that for them, "performance is a very useful way to understand power and identity."

Unearthing 
Unearthing: "Unearthing an ancient, genderqueer griot sits in a waist-high mound of dirt sourced from an unrecognized burial ground of enslaved Africans in New York City. The griot is both human and spirit; neither man or woman; of the past, present, and future. The audience witnesses the griot transform their body into an altar of protection for Black people – living, deceased, and yet-to-be born. During this ritual performance, the griot covers themselves in dirt, glitter, paint, and rum while unearthing stories of Black queer resistance and liberation." - Dixon Place Unearthing Performance Description.

The performance begins with Williams entering into the performance space in a procession. Once at the stage area, which holds a large mound, they cover themselves in dirt and decorate the mound with flowers. Williams then begins to shout "why you always so dirty?" to the audience while covering their arms and legs in dirt, and then eating it. Williams covers their own body with paint and glitter, and comes out of the mound dancing in a style that is reminiscent of the Vogue style of dancing.

Additional works 
In addition to Unearthing, Williams has created other performances such as Where Do The Poor Go (2016), The Pretty Nigga Bitch (Work in Progress), and Growing Pains. Where Do The Poor Go is a site-specific, public performance that investigates gentrification in the Bushwick and Harlem neighborhoods of New York City. They have also worked collaboratively with other artists such as Rashaad Newsome, Nia Witherspoon, and Ann Carlson.

Notes On Digging 
A performative piece created in 2020 that encapsulates the uprisings against anti-Black and anti-Black trans violence and how connecting with the Earth helps them recover from racialized and gendered violence.

Writing 
Kiyan Williams is a cultural writer and commentator who explores issues of reframing narratives around Black female sexuality. They have contributed pieces to the Huffington Post and The Feminist Wire. Additionally, Williams has spoken about the experience of being Black, Queer, and growing up poor.

Awards, residencies, and grants 
 2019/2020 Fountainhead Fellowship at Virginia Commonwealth University
 2017 ASTREA Global Arts Fund Awardee, New York, NY
 2016 Stanford Arts Institute Grant, Stanford University, Palo Alto, CA 
 2016 Trans Justice Funding Project Grant Recipient, New York, NY 
 2016 Queer Emerging Artist Residency, Destiny Art Center, Oakland, CA 
 Celeste Prize  
 2015 Create Dangerously: Writing for Performance Intensive, JACK Theater, New York, NY 
 2014 EMERGENYC Fellowship at the Hemispheric Institute of Performance and Politics at NYU, New York, NY  
 2013 Community Arts Fellowship, Stanford University's Haas Center for Public Service and the Institute for the Diversity in the Arts Artist Grant, Palo Alto, CA 
 2011 Gilder Lehrman History Fellowship, The Gilder Lehrman Institute of American History, Columbia University, New York, NY
 2009 Gates Millennium Scholarship, The Bill and Melinda Gates Foundation, Seattle Washington

External links 

 http://www.kiyanwilliams.com/

References

1991 births
Living people
Artists from Newark, New Jersey
Artists from San Francisco
American contemporary artists
Stanford University alumni
Queer artists
American performance artists
21st-century American artists